Glasgow Air Force Base is a former United States Air Force base near Glasgow, Montana.  It operated from 1957 to 1968 and again from 1971 through 1976.

Major commands to which assigned

 Air Defense Command, 8 February 1957 – 1 April 1960
 Remained as tenant unit until 30 June 1968
 Central Air Defense Force, 2 July 1959
 29th Air Division (Defense), 1 April 1960
 Minot Air Defense Sector, 1 January 1961 – 30 June 1968
 Strategic Air Command, 1 April 1960 – 30 June 1968; 30 September 1971 – 30 September 1976
 Fifteenth Air Force
 810th Strategic Aerospace Division, 1 July 1962 – 1 July 1963; 1 July 1966 – 30 June 1968
 18th Strategic Aerospace Division, 1 July 1963 – 1 September 1964
 821st Strategic Aerospace Division, 15 February 1962 – 1 July 1962; 1 September 1964 – 1 July 1966

Major units assigned

 476th Fighter Group (Defense), 8 February 1957 – 30 June 1968
 Not equipped, 8 February 1957 – 2 July 1959
 13th Fighter-Interceptor Squadron, 2 July 1959 – 30 June 1968 (F-101B)
 4141st Strategic Wing, 1 September 1958 – 1 February 1963
 Not equipped, 1 September 1958 – 1 February 1961
 326th Bombardment Squadron, 1 February 1961 – 1 February 1963 (B-52C)
 91st Bombardment Wing 18 November 1962 – 30 June 1968
 322d Bombardment Squadron, 1 February 1963 – 25 June 1968 (B-52C/D)
 Detached to Advanced Echelon, 3d Air Division: 11 September 1966 – 31 March 1967; 5 February – 30 April 1968
 (deployed to Andersen Air Force Base, Guam for Arc Light Missions)
 (deployed to Kadena Air Force Base, Okinawa for Operation Port Bow; 5 February – 30 April 1968)
 Not operational: 1 May – 25 June 1968
 907th Air Refueling Squadron, 1 July 1963 – 25 June 1968 (KC-135A)
 Detached to Advanced Echelon, 3d Air Division: 11 September 1966 – 31 March 1967; 5 February – 30 April 1968
 (deployed to Andersen Air Force Base, Guam and Kadena Air Force Base, Okinawa)
 Not operational: 1 May – 25 June 1968
 4300th Air Base Squadron, 17 November 1971 – 30 September 1976
 Detached from Fairchild Air Force Base, Washington, for dispersed B-52/KC-135 operations

Note: All aircraft deployed to Fairchild Air Force Base, Washington, 1 April – 30 June 1964 due to runway repairs
References for commands and major units assigned:

See also
 List of military installations in Montana

References
Notes

Sources

 Ravenstein, Charles A. Air Force Combat Wings Lineage and Honors Histories 1947–1977. Maxwell Air Force Base, Alabama: Office of Air Force History 1984. .
 SAC Bases: Glasgow Air Force Base
 Boeing Technical Services - Flight Test Facility
  Abandoned & Little-Known Airfields: Glasgow AFB, Montana

External links
 Glasgow AFB Photo Album 
 McDonnell F-101B Voodoo
 Current-day photos of Glasgow AFB

Installations of the United States Air Force in Montana
Defunct airports in the United States
Airports in Montana
Installations of Strategic Air Command
Buildings and structures in Valley County, Montana
1957 establishments in Montana
Military installations closed in 1976
Military installations established in 1957
1976 disestablishments in Montana